Heydar Gholi Latifiyan (1879 – December 16, 1915), also known as Heydar Latifiyan, was a Supporter of the Persian Constitutional Revolution and the Democrat Party of Iran. He was one of the Iranian world war I Commanders in Persian Campaign. During the occupation of Tehran by the Imperial Russian Army in the World War I (when the troops were sent from Tehran to Qom) due to the destruction theory of transfer of the capital by the provisional constitutional government (National Defence Committee), he organized resistance and people's forces.

Life

Childhood 

Heydar Latifiyan, one of the Latifiyan family, was born in VahnAbad (On that time It was a village in Ray, Tehran, Iran). It had been said that this family was originally from Safavid dynasty that immigrant to near Ray because of the Persian famine of 1870–1872. According to estimates, about one tenth of Iran's population died of hunger in these years. Heydar's Father was among of those who settled around Tehran with the supports of Mirza Hossein Khan Sepahsalar.

Adherence to constitutionalism 
His youth coincided with the assassination of Naser al-Din Shah Qajar, after which the capital underwent many changes. Residents close to the capital, like other Iranians, participated in the great developments of Iran. Heydar tried to support Hossein Pirnia (Moutamen al-Molk), who became the Speaker of the National Council and a six-term representative of the National Council from the Central Province (Tehran) branch of the Democrat Party.

Government of immigrants 
Russia was Iran's northern neighbor at that time and had many wars with Iran during the Qajar period. The British forces in the south and southeast of Iran had caused dissatisfaction among the Iranians by seizing parts of Iran's territory under the pretext of protecting their interests. Therefore, it has been said that Iranians had a strong hatred for the colonists.

During the First World War, despite the official announcement of Iran's neutrality, two countries, Britain and Russia, caused a violation of territorial sovereignty due to a lack of confidence. Russia gave Iran an ultimatum to expel William Morgan Shuster (American lawyer). However, after his departure, Russia continued to influence Iran. Russia, which had previously threatened the National Consultative Assembly, by approaching Tehran (the capital of Iran), caused the situation in Tehran to become critical and the parliament to be dissolved. At the same time as the parliament was dissolved, Russia announced that it had nothing to do with the monarchy. However, the prime minister formed a new cabinet with the presence of many parliamentarians and moved the seat of government from Tehran to Qom to deal with the invaders. From this point of view, they are called the National Defense Committee or the immigrant government. After the capture of Tehran by the Russians, the administration of other free parts of the country was still the responsibility of the immigrant government. This matter upset the Russians. Therefore, ،They marched to Qom to completely destroy the Iranian government.

Heydar along with the rest of the democrats, who were opponents of the Russian and British military attack on Iran, moved towards Qom. At this time, the officers of the Kazakh forces and the Gendarmerie are disturbed and stop fighting the Russians. The responsibility of protecting the area between Tehran, Karaj and Qom has been the responsibility of the 1st Tehran Gendarmerie Regiment based in Yousef Abad and the 2nd Tehran Gendarmerie Regiment based in Baghshah and the Qom Gendarmerie Independent Battalion. With the supports of the Immigration Committee (or the National Defense Committee), Heydar Latifiyan, together with a group of people who knew the geographical location of the region, organized popular forces of resistance against the Russian forces.

Last fight 

"... the Russian army from one side reaches the village of Kolmeh (Fajr town, Nasimshahr), which is located between the Robat Karim road and Tehran, and the local fighters are surrounded from three sides. The Russians start bombarding the area from almost a mile, until in the evening, the strongholds of the local Batop fighters are bombarded. But everyone survives. But in the evening, the infantry riders of the Russian army came closer and the war with swords started and after a bloody clash 70 people were killed..." Hassan Azam Qudsi (Azam Al-Wozara) wrote in the first volume of his memoirs called "My Memories or clarifying the history of a hundred years".

Heydar Latifiyan was also killed like the rest of his comrades. According to the traditions of the local people, the Russians made it difficult to identify the bodies by cutting off the heads of the dead. The only body that could be identified (by his clothes) was that of Heydar Latifiyan, who was buried near the north of Vahan Abad village. (Nowadays, One kilometer to Tehran International Airport). After the defeat of the popular resistance of Robat Karim and his death, Abdul Hossein Farmanfarma expressed his regret through a telegram sent to Isfahan and told the National Defense Committee that:"...In addition to the seven-eight-year exams and the exams of Saveh and Robat Karim (the defeat of popular resistance), gentlemen, I will sit for one more exam in Isfahan and forcefully invite a foreign army to the middle of Iran's soil - which is Isfahan..."

ِِDescendants 
Ali Latifiyan, An Iranian writer, is his great-grandson.

See also 

 Persian campaign (World War I) 
 Persian Constitutional Revolution

References 
 
Iranian revolutionaries
1879 births
1915 deaths
Democrat Party (Persia) politicians
Democrat Party of Iran politicians
People from Ray, Iran
Politicians from Tehran
19th-century Iranian politicians
20th-century Iranian politicians
Democratic socialists
Iranian social democrats
Iranian democracy activists
People of the Persian Constitutional Revolution
Iran–Russia military relations
Political history of Iran
Politics of Qajar Iran
People of Qajar Iran
1915 in Iran
Iranian human rights activists
Liberalism in Iran
Iranian nationalists